The 2006 Sicilian regional election for the renewal of the Sicilian Regional Assembly and the Presidency of Sicily was held on 28 May 2006.

The election was competed by three competitors: Salvatore Cuffaro, incumbent President and House of Freedoms candidate; Rita Borsellino, candidate of The Union; and Nello Musumeci, MEP elected for the National Alliance and now leader of the autonomist movement Sicilian Alliance. In the end, Cuffaro won the election, despite a heavy loss of support compared with five years before, when he was elected with 59.1% of votes.

Candidates

Salvatore Cuffaro, 48, was first elected at the Sicilian Presidency in the July 2001 with 59.1% of regional votes; that election was held immediately after the national election which saw the centre-right win all the 61 Sicilian ridings. Cuffaro is a prominent member of Union of Christian and Centre Democrats, a Christian democratic party. Often associated to the mafia by his critics because of an open investigation by the magistrature of Palermo which brought to a trial commitment, Cuffaro was nevertheless head the regional UDC list of candidates for the April general election.

Rita Borsellino, 61, sister of the late judge Paolo assassinated by the mafia, gained the centre-left candidacy after having won a primary election with over 67% of votes against Ferdinando Latteri. She was not member of any party. 

Nello Musumeci, 51, was a former member of the right-wing National Alliance party; he served as President of the Province of Catania from 1994 to 2003. He left National Alliance in September 2005 in order to found a new autonomist party, Sicilian Alliance, of which he was the leader. 

Pollster claimed this election to be much closer than five years earlier, and majority of surveys even put Borsellino to lead over Cuffaro.  However, Sicily confirmed one more time in the April 2006 national election, in which the House of Freedoms obtained 57% of regional votes, to be still a centre-right stronghold. The election was in fact characterized by separate contemporary votes for centre-right parties and Rita Borsellino as president, as the sum of centre-right coalition parties obtained over 60% of votes. In any case, the disjoint vote was not sufficient to ensure Borsellino to win the election, and Cuffaro was confirmed president of Sicily.

Results

Sources

External links

Candidates
 Salvatore "Totò" Cuffaro
 Rita Borsellino
 Sebastiano "Nello" Musumeci

Elections in Sicily
2006 elections in Italy
May 2006 events in Europe